The Billboard Top Latin albums chart, published in Billboard magazine, is a chart that features Latin music sales information. These data are compiled by Nielsen SoundScan from a sample that includes music stores, music departments at electronics and department stores, internet sales (both physical and via digital downloads) and verifiable sales from concert venues in United States.

There were eleven number-one albums on this chart in 2000, including the greatest hits collection Desde Un Principio: From the Beginning by Marc Anthony, which spent a non-consecutive run of 13 weeks at the top of the chart starting in early December 1999. Los Temerarios and Conjunto Primavera peaked at number one for the first time with Morir de Amor and En La Madrugada se Fue, respectively. Both albums received Latin Grammy nominations for Best Grupero Performance, which was awarded to the latter one. MTV Unplugged, by Colombian performer Shakira, also peaked at number one for two weeks and went on to win the Grammy Award for Best Latin Pop Album at the 43rd Grammy Awards. With All My Hits - Todos Mis Exitos Vol. 2, Tejano music performer Selena had her sixth album peak at number one (the fifth to do so posthumously). Son By Four spent 12 non-consecutive weeks at the summit with their eponymous album, which received a gold certification by the Recording Industry Association of America.

Mexican performer Alejandro Fernández and Cuban singer–songwriter Gloria Estefan both released the second number-one albums of their careers. Guerra de Estados Pesados, a compilation album with music by Chuy Vega, El Jilguero, El Original de la Sierra, El Marquez de Sinaloa, Los Gatilleros de Durango, Los Herederos del Norte, Los Traileros de Durango and Los Comandantes de Nuevo León, spent one week at the top but dropped to number 16 the following week. Christina Aguilera spent 14 weeks at number one with her first Spanish album Mi Reflejo, and Galería Caribe by Guatemalan singer-songwriter Ricardo Arjona also hit the top spot of the chart.

Albums

References

2000 Latin
United States Latin Albums
2000 in Latin music